The Little Liverpool Range is a mountain range of the Scenic Rim and Lockyer Creek valley, part of the Great Dividing Range, which is located in the South East region of Queensland, Australia.

Location and features
The range extends from the Main Range to the west of Aratula northwards to Plainland, where the Warrego Highway crosses the range. The range forms the drainage divide between the Bremer River valley from the Laidley Creek valley, a tributary of Lockyer Creek.

Alan Cunningham and his party were the first Europeans to explore the area. They crossed the range in 1829.

Mountain peaks in the Little Liverpool Range include Mount Castle, Kangaroo Mountain, Grass Tree Knoll, Mt Beau Brummell, Mount Stradbroke, Mount Grandchester, and Two Tree Hill.

Railways 
The Little Liverpool Range was an obstacle that hindered development of a railway from Brisbane to Toowoomba. Under the range are two tunnels. It is the oldest and longest railway tunnel in the state. The railway has a gradient of between 1 in 50 to nil over the range.

See also

List of mountains in Australia

References

South East Queensland
Great Dividing Range